This is a list of properties and historic districts on the National Register of Historic Places within the city limits of St. Louis, Missouri, south of Interstate 64 and west of Downtown St. Louis. For listings in Downtown St. Louis, see National Register of Historic Places listings in Downtown and Downtown West St. Louis. For those north of I-64 and west of downtown, see National Register of Historic Places listings in St. Louis north and west of downtown. For listings in St. Louis County and outside the city limits of St. Louis, see National Register of Historic Places listings in St. Louis County, Missouri.

Current listings

|}

Former listings

|}

References

History of St. Louis
South
St. Louis-related lists